Wolf Branch Nature Preserve is a  nature preserve in Hillsborough County, Florida. The preserve is managed by Hillsborough County's Conservation and Environmental Lands Management Department  Hillsborough County Conservation and Environmental Lands Management Department</ref>.

High tides reverse the course of the creek and move juvenile mullet, snook and reds. Roseate spoonbills, reddish egrets, wood storks, and at least one bobcat call the preserve home.

The distressed area was purchased by the county in 1993 for $1.8 million. Historically it was used for pasture and cropland. Restoration projects took place on the property starting with eradicating exotic vegetation, then sculpting both isolated and interconnected wetlands to attract fisheries and other wildlife.

References

External links
Hillsborough County listings at National Register of Historic Places
Hillsborough County listings at Florida's Office of Cultural and Historical Programs

Parks in Hillsborough County, Florida